Kopyta  is a village in the administrative district of Gmina Brodnica, within Śrem County, Greater Poland Voivodeship, in west-central Poland. From 1975 to 1998, Kopyta administratively belonged to Poznań Voivodeship.

The village has a population of 60.

References

Kopyta